Special municipality, historically known as Yuan-controlled municipality is a first-level administrative division unit in the Republic of China (Taiwan). Under the administrative structure of Taiwan, it is the highest level of division in Taiwan and is equivalent to a province. Since the streamlining of provinces in 1998, the special municipalities along with provincial cities and counties have all governed directly under the central government.

Currently total six cities are designated as special municipalities: Taipei, New Taipei City, Taoyuan, Taichung, Tainan, and Kaohsiung, all located in the most densely populated regions in the western half of the island. These special municipalities encompass five most populous metropolitan areas in Taiwan, accounting for more than two-thirds of the national population.

History 

The first municipalities of the ROC were established in 1927 soon after they were designated as "cities" during the 1920s. Nominally, Dairen was a municipality as well, although it was under Japanese control. It consisted of the original 11 cities of Nanking, Shanghai, Peking (Peiping), Tientsin, Tsingtao, Chungking, Sian, Canton, Hankow (now part of Wuhan), Shenyang, and Harbin. These cities were first called special municipalities/cities, but were later renamed Yuan-controlled municipalities.

Before the end of World War II, the island of Taiwan (Formosa) was under Japanese rule, with 11 cities established within its administrative divisions. Following the Japanese surrender in 1945, the Republic of China (ROC) took control of Taiwan, most of pre-1945 cities in Taiwan were reorganized as provincial cities, but Yilan and Hualien became the first two county-administered cities.

After the loss of the mainland to the Chinese Communist Party in 1949, all the special municipalities established in mainland China were lost. The new communist-led People's Republic of China government replaced the Yuan-controlled municipalities with direct-controlled municipalities. The Kuomintang-led government of the Republic of China lost the Chinese Civil War and relocated to Taipei, Taiwan. By the time of its retreat, no special municipalities was established in Taiwan or other territories under effective control of the ROC government.

In 1967, Taipei City, the first special municipality in Taiwan was created. Taipei served as the capital of the country starting in 1949 and was at the time the most populous city. The scope of the Taipei special municipality includes the original provincial City of Taipei and 4 of its neighboring townships in Taipei County, including Neihu, Nangang, Muzha and Jingmei. In the next year, Shilin and Beitou of Yangmingshan Administrative Bureau (a county-equivalent administrative division) were also merged into Taipei.

In 1979, the major international port and industrial city in the southwest of the country — Kaohsiung — were also upgraded to a special municipality. Territory of the Kaohsiung special municipality includes the original provincial Kaohsiung City and Siaogang Township in Kaohsiung County.

At this time, Taiwan was under martial law. All national and municipal level elections were suspended. The mayors of Taipei and Kaohsiung were assigned by the Executive Yuan (central government), not by elections until 1994. For this reason the special municipalities were also called Yuan-controlled municipalities at this period.

Following the democratic reforms in the early 1990s, more thoughts of administrative division reform and reorganization were widely discussed. The Local Government Act was passed by the Legislative Yuan (the Parliament) in 1999. This Act regulates the local self-governance bodies and came with some articles to deal with the possible changes of administrative divisions. In the Act also states that cities with population of over 1,250,000 and with significance on political, economic and cultural development may form a special municipality.

The 2007 amendment of Local Government Act states that a county or city with population over two million may grant some extra privileges in local autonomy that was designed for special municipalities. This type of counties are often called quasi-municipalities. Taipei County was the first division within this case. In 2009, another amendment of Local Government Act gave councils of counties and cities the right to file petitions to reform themselves into special municipalities. Four proposals were approved by the Executive Yuan in 2009
 Kaohsiung: merged from Kaohsiung Special Municipality and Kaohsiung County
 New Taipei: reformed from Taipei County
 Taichung: merged from Taichung Provincial City and Taichung County
 Tainan: merged from Tainan Provincial City and Tainan County
The four newly created special municipalities were formally established on December 25, 2010 with the inauguration of the new mayors.

In June 2010, the population of Taoyuan County also grew over 2 million and were qualified for being a quasi-municipality since 2011. The county government also sent a proposal to become a special municipality in 2012. Executive Yuan approved the proposal and the special municipality of Taoyuan were formally established on December 25, 2014.

Currently, there are in total six special municipalities under the central government. The special municipalities cover the top five most populous metropolitan areas in Taiwan and over two thirds (2/3) of the national population.

Current Special Municipalities 

There are currently six special municipalities:

Their self-governed bodies (executive and legislature) regulated by the Local Government Act are:

In Taiwanese municipalities, the mayor is the highest-ranking official in charge. The mayor is directly elected by the people registered in the municipality for a duration of four years.

Future
In Hsinchu City and Hsinchu County, it was proposed in September 2021 that both are to be upgraded to the nation's newest special municipality. Similarly, Changhua County and Changhua City have been expressed interest to become its special municipality that October. The Tsai Ing-wen administration had approved the proposal to merge Hsinchu county and city in December 2021 but rejected Changhua due to the county's decline of population below the 1.25 million required by Article 4 of the Local Government Act for a region to be eligible for an upgrade.

See also
 Political divisions of Taiwan (1895–1945)
 Cities designated by government ordinance of Japan
 Direct-administered municipalities of China
 Arrondissement, an equivalent type of urban district in some (mainly French-speaking) countries and territories

Notes

Words in native languages

References 

 
Subdivisions of Taiwan
Administrative divisions in Asia